Adam Odzimek (7 October 1944 – 13 March 2022) was a Polish Roman Catholic prelate.

Odzimek was born in Radom, Poland, on 7 October 1944. He was ordained to the priesthood in 1969. He served as titular bishop of 'Tadamata' and was auxiliary bishop of the Roman Catholic Diocese of Sandomierz, Poland, from 1985 to 1992 and as auxiliary bishop of the Roman Catholic Diocese of Radom, Poland from 1992 until his retirement in 2019.

Odzimek died in Radom on 13 March 2022, at the age of 77.

References
 

1944 births
2022 deaths
People from Radom
Polish Roman Catholic titular bishops